Kureh-ye Khosravi (also Romanized as Kūreh-ye Khosravī; also known as Kūreh Khosrow) is a village in Sar Firuzabad Rural District, Firuzabad District, Kermanshah County, Kermanshah Province, Iran. At the 2006 census, its population was 43, in 9 families.

References 

Populated places in Kermanshah County